

Character set
The following table shows code page 668. Each character is shown with its equivalent Unicode code point. Only the second half of the table (code points 128–255) is shown, the first half (code points 0–127) being the same as code page 437. This code page is supported by PTS-DOS and FreeDOS. Code page 668 is Polish, code page 852 compatible, provides national characters on the same points as with code page 852, but is limited to Polish glyphs only, thus preserves more graphical characters.

There is also another definition of code page 668 but unfortunately there is no information where it is used.

References 

668